Jean Laviron (26 April 1915, in Paris – 15 February 1987, in Fresneaux-Montchevreuil) was a French film director and screenwriter.

Filmography

Director 

 1951 : Un amour de parapluie
 1951 : Come Down, Someone Wants You 
 1953 : Au diable la vertu
 1953 : Légère et court vêtue
 1954 : Soirs de Paris
 1954 : Yours Truly, Blake
 1959 : Les Motards
 1960 : Les Héritiers
 1962 : L'inspecteur Leclerc enquête (2 episodes)
 1965 : Mon filleul et moi
 1967 : Les créatures du bon Dieu
 1970 : Ça vous arrivera demain
 1975 : Erreurs judiciaires, TV serial
 1978 : Preuve à l'appui (TV serial)
 1979 : Par-devant notaire

Screenwriter 
 1950 : Les Derniers jours de Pompéi by Marcel L'Herbier
 1951 : Descendez, on vous demande
 1953 : Au diable la vertu
 1953 : Légère et court vêtue
 1954 : Soirs de Paris
 1959 : Les Motards
 1960 : Les Héritiers
 1965 : Mon filleul et moi
 1979 : Par-devant notaire

Assistant director 
 1951 : Rome-Paris-Rome (Signori, in carrozza !) by Luigi Zampa
 1946 : The Queen's Necklace by Marcel L'Herbier
 1946 : Happy Go Lucky by Marcel L'Herbier
 1945 : La vie de bohème by Marcel L'Herbier
 1943 : L'Honorable Catherine by Marcel L'Herbier
 1942 : La Nuit fantastique by Marcel L'Herbier

External links 

Film directors from Paris
20th-century French screenwriters
Collège Stanislas de Paris alumni
1915 births
1987 deaths